Stefano Chiodi (26 December 1956 – 4 November 2009) was an Italian professional footballer who played as a winger.

Honours

Club 
A.C. Milan
Serie A: 1978–79

References

External links 
Profile at MagliaRossonera.it 
Profile at EmozioneCalcio.it 
International caps at FIGC.it 

1956 births
2009 deaths
Italian footballers
Italy under-21 international footballers
Association football midfielders
Serie A players
Serie B players
Serie C players
S.S. Teramo Calcio players
Bologna F.C. 1909 players
A.C. Milan players
S.S. Lazio players
A.C. Prato players